Hostile Environment is the third solo album of rapper/emcee Rasco. It was his second and last album with Copasetik Records. The album contains some familiar and new features, both lyrically and in terms of production.

Track listing

2001 albums
Albums produced by DJ Khalil
Albums produced by J. Rawls
Rasco albums